Bader bin Saud bin Mohammed bin Abdulaziz bin Saud bin Faisal bin Turki Al Saud (born 27 November 1969), is a Saudi Public Affairs Writer under the pen name Bader bin Saud, Paratrooper Brigadier General of the Saudi Arabian Ministry of Interior,  Assistant Professor, and previously president of the Saudi Students Clubs in the United Kingdom and Ireland.

He was the Deputy Commander of the Special Forces for the Hajj and Umrah And the Assistant Commander for Special Force Security at Makkah’s Grand Mosque. His father is Prince Saud bin Mohammed Al Saud, and his mother Princess Alanoud bint Abdullah bin Abdulmohsen Alfirm. Two of his siblings are known poets, Prince Saad Al Saud, known as "Munadi," (the caller). The other is Prince Abdulaziz bin Saud Al Saud, known as "Alsamir", (the one who stays up all night) Prince Bader has nine children – Prince Faisal, Prince Khalid, Prince Saud, Prince Fahad, Prince Mohammed, Prince Salman, Prince Abdulaziz, Princess Reem and Princess Aljohara.

Educational qualifications
 From (2016-2020), Ph.D. in Information Sciences from Faculty of Arts and Humanities at King Abdulaziz University
 From (2008–2014), Ph.D. in Media and Communication from Goldsmiths, University of London 
 From (2003–2004), M.A in International Journalism, Westminster University
 From (1994–1995), Postgraduate Diploma in Police Sciences, from King Fahd Security College
 From (1989–1992), he earned his bachelor's degree in Security Sciences, from King Fahd Security College

Work experience

After his graduation he worked as an officer, detective, and search officer at Riyadh Provincial Police (Alsulaimania and Alolaya Police Station). He moved afterwards to General Intelligence to work there as an officer for the special operations. He then got back to the General Directorate of Public Security and worked as a detective at Makkah Province Police at both (Jeddah Governate Police – Alsalamah Police Station). He then became director at the Awareness Division under the Relations and Advise department at the Makkah Province Police Headquarter. Then, he was promoted to Director of the Public Relations and Media department at the Makkah Province Police Headquarter. Afterwards, he moved to the Holy Mosque's security Special Forces to work there as the director for the internal patrol section, the director for the yard's patrol, the director for the patrol's division, then, he was appointed as the director for the operations' division at the Hajj and Umrah Special Forces, as well as the Deputy Commander of the Public Security Training City in Al Madinah Region, Saudi Arabia, and at the Saudi Arabian Ministry of Interior, he is now working as the Assistant Commander for Special Force Security at Makkah’s Grand Mosque. When he was a Lieutenant, the late Custodian of the Two Holy Mosques King Fahd awarded him (Late King Faisal’s Merit from the fourth rank) for his distinction at work. He also gained his second Ph.D. in Information Science (Crowds Management) from King Abdulaziz University and received special fieldwork training at the intelligence, anti-terrorism, thunderbolt, parachute, sniping, combat diving, and explosives divisions.

Activities
 From (2019) until present, writing a weekly column at two Saudi newspapers; Al Riyadh (newspaper) and Okaz.
 From (2020-2021), Assistant Professor in Crowd Science and Strategic Planning, Umm Al-Qura University.
 In (2019), Assistant Professor in Counterterrerism Studies, King Abdulaziz University.  
 In (April 2019), coordinating, co-managing and co- presenting the workshop on developing the Saudi Ministry of Interior's research strategy.
 From (2006–2015), columnist at the Saudi Daily Newspaper Okaz.
 In (October 2012), President of the Organizing Committees at the 6th International Saudi Scientific Conference, held at Brunel University, London
 From (2011–2012), President of the Saudi Students Clubs in the United Kingdom and Ireland for its 31st cycle, London, UK
 From (Jan 2010– Jan 2012), President for the Saudi Journalists Club in the UK for its 1st and 2nd cycle
 From (2008–2011), member at the Media, Communication and Cultural Studies Association (MeCCSA)
 In (October 2011), member at the organising committee and scientific committee for the Arab Media Students Forum, at the School of Oriental and African Studies (SOAS)
 From (2006–2009), columnist at the Media and Communication Magazine
 In (April 2009), coordinator at the 3rd forum for the Postgraduate Students in Media and Communication Department, King's College London
 From (2000–2004), published articles in various Saudi publications such as Aljazira Newspaper, Almadinah Newspaper, Alsharq Alawsat Newspaper, Arab News newspaper, Albilad, Elaf Online, and Fawasil Magazine
 In (2011), published short story in the Wednesday's edition for Almadinah Daily Newspaper titled, "Dying's first experience"
 In (1999), presented a TV program about traffic accidents during the Gulf Traffic Week
 From (1992–2000), worked as a freelance journalist at Aljazira Newspaper
 From (1984–1990), wrote and published Nabati Poetry

Media and scientific participations
 In (May 2018), presented a journal article about, " Previous Experiences and their Role in Enhancing Security Measures in Security Facilities" at the 8th specialized seminar at the King Fahd Security College.
 In (April 2016), presented a journal article about, "The Writer and the National Major Events", at the 2nd Saudi Writers Forum at the Cultural Club in the Eastern Province.
 In (September 2011), presented journal article about, "The Writer and the Cultural Responsibility," at the 1st Saudi Writers Forum at the Cultural Club in the Eastern Province.
 In (December 2010), presented a lecture entitled: "Stereotyping Oriental Woman: a Case Study of Representations and Challenges", at the Cultural Club in the Hail Province.
 In (April 1999), he participated in a seminar about Society and Security at the King Fahd Security College with a journal article about, "the Relationship between the Police and Journalism.

Published papers
 In (March 2019), copublished a scientific article titled, "Tacit Knowledge and its Role in Enhancing Safeguarding Measures in Security Facilities".
 In (March 2015), published scientific article for the Society and Security seminar at the King Fahd Security College titled, "Social Networks Approaches to Handle the Holy Mosque's Security Proceedings".
 In (November 2009), published scientific article in English about, "The Image of the Kingdom of Saudi Arabia in the Sunday's Newspaper after 11 September".
 In (November 2008), produced a scientific review in English for the book, "The Internet in Egypt and the Arab World: a scientific study with a futuristic vision", by Dr Rasha Abdullah.

References

External links
 mnadi.com
 okaz.com.sa
 alyaum.com
 arabnews.com
 kfsc.edu.sa
 intellectbooks.co.uk

1969 births
Living people
Alumni of Goldsmiths, University of London
Saudi Arabian journalists
Saudi Arabian military personnel
Saudi Arabian princes